The 1974 Macdonald Brier, the Canadian men's national curling championship was held from March 4 to 9, 1974 at the London Gardens in London, Ontario. The total attendance for the week was 48,170.

Team Alberta, who was skipped by Hec Gervais captured the Brier tankard by finishing round robin play 8–2.

The Gervais rink would go onto represent Canada in the 1974 Air Canada Silver Broom, the men's world curling championship held in Bern, Switzerland where they lost in the semifinal to Sweden.

Alberta's 4–2 victory over Quebec in Draw 11 set then Brier records for lowest combined score by both teams in one game (6) and most blank ends in one game (7). These records would be Macdonald era (until ) records that were matched twice in that era and eventually broken later.

Event Summary
After the Thursday evening draw (Draw 8), there were five teams that were in contention for the championship. Alberta led the way with a 7–1 record with Quebec and Saskatchewan tied for second at 5–2, New Brunswick right behind at 5–3, and Northern Ontario at 4–3.

The Friday afternoon draw saw the standings tighten. First place Alberta lost big to Ontario 12–5, Quebec defeated Newfoundland 9–4, Saskatchewan rolled past Nova Scotia 11–3. Northern Ontario would be eliminated from contention with an 11–6 loss to British Columbia while New Brunswick draw a bye. With Alberta, Quebec, and Saskatchewan all with two losses, this Brier would come down to the last two draws or even a tiebreaker.

The penultimate draw on Friday evening (Draw 10) saw Alberta draw a bye meaning the other three teams could catch some ground heading into Saturday afternoon. However, the only contender who won was Saskatchewan as they beat Newfoundland 8–5. Quebec would lose to Ontario 8–5 while New Brunswick would be eliminated after losing 10–8 to BC. With Saskatchewan's win, both Alberta and Saskatchewan were tied for first with 7–2 records while Quebec sat at 6–3. The final draw would pit Alberta against Quebec while Saskatchewan would play Ontario. Anything from an outright championship, two-way tiebreaker, or a three-way tiebreaker was possible after the final draw.

The featured matchups in the final draw were anti-climatic in different ways. The Ontario and Saskatchewan matchup saw the game tied at 1 after three ends. This is as close as Saskatchewan would get as Ontario scored three in the fourth and stole one the next two ends to take a commanding 6–1 lead through the halfway point. Saskatchewan would attempt a comeback, but Ontario would counter each Saskatchewan score as Ontario would eventually win 11–8 meaning that Saskatchewan would need some help from Quebec to force a three-way tiebreaker.

Alberta and Quebec would be a low-scoring affair as five of the first seven ends were blanked with the score tied at 1. Alberta would break the ice a bit with two in the eighth and taking a 3–1 lead in the process. Quebec cut the lead down to 3–2 in the ninth end. The next two ends were blanked and Alberta would clinch the Brier tankard with a single in the last end for a 4–2 win giving Gervais his first Brier title since .

The official Dominion Curling Association stones were said to be so bad at the event, that nine of the 11 competing skips petitioned to have the rocks replaced (only the skips of New Brunswick and Newfoundland didn't sign, as this had been their first Brier). Sure enough, the rocks would be sold-off that summer, and would never be used at the Brier again.

The 1974 Brier was also the final year where throwers were not allowed to slide past the hog line on their throws. However, after enforcing the rules earlier in the tournament, officials stopped part way through due to backlash from some of the curlers. Then later on, officials changed the rules mid-week to state that curlers could slide over the line as long as they had released the rock first.

Teams
The teams are listed as follows:

Round Robin standings

Round Robin results
All draw times are listed in Eastern Standard Time (UTC-05:00).

Draw 1
Monday, March 4, 2:00 pm

Draw 2
Monday, March 4, 7:30 pm

Draw 3
Tuesday, March 5, 9:00 am

Draw 4
Tuesday, March 5, 2:00 pm

Draw 5
Wednesday, March 6, 2:00 pm

Draw 6
Wednesday, March 6, 7:30 pm

Draw 7
Thursday, March 7, 2:00 pm

Draw 8
Thursday, March 7, 7:30 pm

Draw 9
Friday, March 8, 2:00 pm

Draw 10
Friday, March 8, 7:30 pm

Draw 11
Saturday, March 9, 1:00 pm

Awards

All-Star Team 
The media selected the following curlers as All-Stars.

Ross G.L. Harstone Award
The Ross Harstone Award was presented to the player chosen by their fellow peers as the curler who best represented Harstone's high ideals of good sportsmanship, observance of the rules, exemplary conduct and curling ability.

References

External links
1974 MacDonald Brier at Soudog's Curling History

Sports competitions in London, Ontario
Macdonald Brier, 1974
The Brier
Curling in Ontario
1974 in Ontario